Armando Humberto Soto Ochoa (born May 11, 1980), best known as Humberto Soto, is a Mexican professional boxer. A veteran of the sport for over 20 years, he is a former world champion in two weight classes, having held the WBC super featherweight title from 2008 to 2009, and the WBC lightweight title from 2010 to 2011. He also held the WBC interim featherweight title from 2005 to 2006.

Professional career
Soto made his pro debut at the age of 17 and accumulated a record of 36-5-2, which included a 14 fight undefeated streak, before challenging for his first major title.

Featherweight
On August 20, 2005, Soto won the interim WBC Featherweight title by beating Rocky Juarez, in a fight which he accepted on two weeks notice.

On January 17, 2006, Soto defended his interim title by knocking out Oscar León in the 9th round. He vacated his interim featherweight title and defeated Ivan Valle in a WBC Super Featherweight title eliminator bout.

On January 22, 2007, Soto defeated Humberto Toledo (30-2-2) by third-round knockout. In his next bout, he defeated Bobby Pacquiao by seventh-round knockout.

On November 17, 2007, Soto fought reigning WBO Super Featherweight champion Joan Guzmán but lost the bout by unanimous decision.

Soto vs. Guzman

On November 17, 2007, Humberto Soto fought WBO Junior-Welterweight champion Joan Guzman. The Dominican champion dominated the fight based on his speed of hands, reflexes, and superior boxing skills, effectively counter punching the relentless attack of Soto, who showcased tremendous strength, courage and determination. Guzman won the bout by Unanimous Decision.

Super Featherweight

Soto vs. Lorenzo
On June 28, 2008, Soto faced off against Francisco Lorenzo (33-4, 14 KOs) for the vacant interim WBC Super Featherweight title. Soto knocked Lorenzo down twice in the fourth round with a barrage of punches. However, after lengthy consultations with officials at ringside, referee Joe Cortez disqualified Soto for hitting Lorenzo after he was down in what appeared to be a grazing punch. Cortez's decision was widely criticized and the WBC refused to award Lorenzo the title.

WBC president José Sulaimán condemned the decision as a "gross injustice" and one of the biggest he has seen in a long time. Sulaiman also announced that the WBC board of governors will vote on whether to declare the fight a no contest or to declare Soto the winner by knockout. Lorenzo, therefore, was not presented the green WBC belt as its champion, since it, though, opted to ignore the official verdict, and declared the title vacant. Sulaiman stated he wasn’t seeking to overrule the decision, but: "While we respect the authority of the (Nevada commission) for a decision of the fight, we are the only ones to have the authority to decide on the decision relating to the WBC world title."

On October 11, 2008, Soto defeated Gamaliel Díaz to win the interim WBC Super Featherweight title by technical knock out. Soto knocked Diaz down in the first round and dominated him throughout the bout. Diaz was docked two points for excessive holding and his corner refused to send him out for the eleventh round.

On December 20, 2008, Soto captured the vacant WBC Super Featherweight Championship with a 12-round unanimous decision over Francisco Lorenzo in a rematch of their controversial bout. Lorenzo was repeatedly warned for low-blows and headbutting throughout the bout. Lorenzo was docked one point in the 7th round for headbutting and another in the 8th for excessive holding. The final scores were 117-109 from two of the judges and 118-108 on the other card in favor of Soto.

In 2009, Soto successfully defended his WBC Super Featherweight title 3 times. On December 12, 2009, Soto moved up to the lightweight division and defeated former two-time champion Jesús Chávez by a 10-round unanimous decision.

Lightweight
On March 13, 2010, Soto claimed the WBC Lightweight Championship by defeating David Diaz. Soto dropped Diaz in the opening and final rounds en route to a unanimous decision victory.

On May 15, 2010, Soto made his first title defense against Ricardo Dominguez. Soto won the fight with a 12-round unanimous decision with the judges scoring the fight, 118-110 on two of the scorecards and 117-112 on the other one for Soto.

Soto and Urbano Antillon staged a stirring world lightweight title bout at the Honda Center. Soto, relying on his ability to strike the challenger with barrages, made his third successful title defense by outlasting Maywood's Antillon in a close unanimous decision, December 4, 2010.

Super Lightweight
In July 2011 Soto relinquished his WBC Lightweight Title in anticipation of competing in the junior welterweight division.

A bout between hard-hitting Argentinian junior welterweight  and Soto has been confirmed for late April. Soto is riding a 14-bout winning streak that includes six knockouts.

Soto vs. Sollano
On June 23, 2012 Humberto Soto faced hard-hitting junior welterweight Lucas Matthysse. dropped Soto in the fifth round. Soto's corner stopped the bout between the rounds.

Professional boxing record

See also
List of Mexican boxing world champions

References

External links

Boxers from Sinaloa
Sportspeople from Los Mochis
1980 births
Living people
Mexican male boxers
Super-bantamweight boxers
Light-welterweight boxers
Welterweight boxers
World Boxing Council champions
Featherweight boxers
World super-featherweight boxing champions
World lightweight boxing champions